The Firearms (Amendment) Act 1997 was introduced in the United Kingdom by the Conservative government of John Major, in response to the Dunblane school massacre and the recommendations of the Cullen Report that followed it.

It effectively banned the private possession of all handguns other than those chambered for .22 rimfire cartridges in Great Britain (not Northern Ireland) by making them subject to Section 5 (Prohibited Weapons) of the Firearms Acts.

Tony Blair's Labour Government followed later in the year with the Firearms (Amendment) (No. 2) Act 1997 which banned .22 handguns.

See also 

 Firearms regulation in the United Kingdom

References

External links

United Kingdom Acts of Parliament 1997
Gun politics in the United Kingdom
Dunblane massacre